Ex Cathedra is a leading British choir and early music ensemble based in Birmingham in the West Midlands, England. It performs choral music spanning the 15th to 21st centuries, and regularly commissions new works.

Ex Cathedra was founded in Birmingham in 1969 by Jeffrey Skidmore OBE, who is its artistic director and conductor. It comprises a chamber choir of about 40 singers, a specialist vocal Consort made up of ten professional singers who feature regularly as soloists, and a Baroque ensemble/orchestra. It is known for its passion for seeking out the best, the unfamiliar and the unexpected in the choral repertoire and for giving dynamic performances underpinned by detailed research.

Each year, the choir presents a season of diverse programmes in a variety of venues in and around Birmingham, across the Midlands and in London. It has been a resident ensemble at Birmingham Town Hall Symphony Hall since 2007. Since 2014 has made regular appearances at Hereford Cathedral, St Peter's Collegiate Church in Wolverhampton, Southwell Minster and St James the Greater in Leicester.

Ex Cathedra have been invited to perform in concert series and festivals across the UK and as far afield as Israel and New York, including the BBC Proms where it performed Stockhausen in 2013, the Barbican Centre, Brighton Early Music Festival, Cheltenham Music Festival, Edinburgh International Festival, Kilkenny Festival, Lichfield Festival, London Festival of Baroque Music, Spitalfields Festival, St David's Festival, Three Choirs Festival and York Early Music Festival. The group has also appeared at festivals in Belgium, Finland, France, (Germany), Israel, Italy and Spain. 

Ex Cathedra have collaborated with Fretwork (music group), the City Musick, His Majestys Sagbutts & Cornetts, Concerto Palatino, Birmingham Opera Company, Sinfonia New York, Birmingham Royal Ballet, the City of Birmingham Symphony Orchestra, Quebecois dance company Cas Public, the Shakespeare Institute, and the Shakespeare Birthplace Trust.

The first period instrument orchestra to be established in an English regional city, Ex Cathedra's Baroque Orchestra was founded as part of the choir's 1983–1984 season and made its début with a performance of Bach's Mass in B Minor. Comprising the UK's leading period instrumentalists, the orchestra's principals regularly give master classes and coach students at the Birmingham Conservatoire as part of its early music programme.

Music education
Ex Cathedra has its own youth and children's choirs, the Academy of Vocal Music, for children aged 4–20. In 2017 it launched a Scholarships scheme for young professionals and, in partnership with Birmingham Conservatoire, a Student Scholarships scheme.

In addition, since 1990 the choir have been involved in education programmes in schools and local communities. It established Ring of Sound, an intergenerational choir for the Perry Common Regeneration Project and runs Singing Communities Ladywood, a community choir in the Ladywood inner city district of Birmingham.

Ex Cathedra's 'Singing Medicine' project has worked with children every week across all wards since 2004 at Birmingham Children's Hospital, at paediatric wards at Birmingham Heartland's Hospital since 2011, and at Birmingham Women's Hospital since 2016.

For over 25 years, Ex Cathedra has worked extensively in schools, particularly focusing on primary schools. This activity expanded during the 2007–2008 academic year, when Ex Cathedra inducted its 'Singing Playgrounds' project in schools in Birmingham, Coventry, Derby and London as part of the government's Sing Up initiative. By 2017, 'Singing Playgrounds' had reached over 600 schools across the UK and as far afield as Belgium, China, New Zealand, Singapore and Thailand.

Recordings
Ex Cathedra have made a number of critically acclaimed recordings for ASV Records, NMC, Orchid, Signum Records, Somm Records, Hyperion Records, and on its own label. It is well known for its recordings of French and Latin American Baroque music. 

In 2015 the CD 'Britten to America' was shortlisted for a Grammy Award, whilst 'A French Baroque Diva' won a Gramophone Award 2015 (Recital category): "It is no longer enough for recitals merely to bunch together a dozen or so favourite lollipops. The most stimulating essays in the genre are revealing a clear fashion for a proper conceptual theme that requires some scholarly research and creative programming, placing musical entertainment and philological exploration on an equal par. The shortlisted finalists for this year's Recital Award typify this trend, and best of the distinguished crop is Jeffrey Skidmore and Carolyn Sampson's exposition of the career of Marie Fel (1713–94)... Skidmore's expert direction, Ex Cathedra's stylish orchestra (and expert choir) and Sampson's sincere singing ensure that this is both musically thrilling and a fascinating contextual journey."

Hyperion lawsuit
In 2001, Ex Cathedra recorded four works by Michel-Richard de Lalande for Hyperion Records. The sessions used editions prepared by scholar Lionel Sawkins. Sawkins went on to sue Hyperion for royalties arising from his claimed copyright in the editions. The recording was issued but subsequently withdrawn from the market after Sawkins won the lawsuit and subsequent appeal. 

Upon Hyperion's appeal, the Court of Appeal held on 19 May 2005 that Sawkins owned the copyright in his modern performing editions of the de Lalande music, even though de Lalande's music itself was out of copyright. The decision was not welcomed by all. Peter Phillips, the director of the Tallis Scholars and a music editor himself, said: "All the music I perform has to be edited, or we couldn't read it. But copyright should be there ... to reward creativity, not scholarship or diligence. How much an editor did or did not write should never be asked and judged upon during a million-pound lawsuit involving a small and innovative recording company."

See also
 Arts in Birmingham – classical music
 Jeffrey Skidmore
 List of early music ensembles

Notes

References
 .
 Programme for Ex Cathedra's performance Parisian Vespers: Summer Vespers by Candlelight at The Oratory, Birmingham, on 18 June 2008.
 Sawkins v. Hyperion Records Limited [2004] EWHC 1530, High Court (Chancery Division). Retrieved 17 December 2008.

Further reading

 .
 .
 .
 .
 .
 .
 .
 .
 .

External links
 Official website
 Ex Cathedra on Goldberg, the early-music portal
 Ex Cathedra on the website of Hyperion Records

British early music ensembles
Early music choirs
Early music consorts
Early music orchestras
English orchestras
Musical groups established in 1969
Musical groups from Birmingham, West Midlands
English choirs
English vocal groups
Baroque music groups